Gulabi is a 1995 Telugu romantic thriller film starring J. D. Chakravarthy and Maheswari in the lead roles. The film was directed by Krishna Vamsi, produced by Ram Gopal Varma and was co-produced by Amitabh Bachchan Corporation Limited. Upon release, the film received positive reviews and was declared a hit at the box office. The film was dubbed into Tamil as Idhayame Idhayame. The film was remade in Hindi as Aashiq (2001).

Plot
Gulabi is an action-packed love story set in the backdrop of human trafficking of young girls to Dubai. It is inspired from a real incident that came in news dailies when police arrested a few Dubai-based businessmen trying to smuggle girls from Hyderabad.

Cast

Production
Initially producer Suresh Babu offered a project to Krishna Vamsi and asked him to narrate the story. Vamsi asked the assurance of confirming the film before narrating the story. Suresh babu told that he will give Venkatesh's dates after the first narration, but Krishna vamsi asked confirmation of the project before the narration. On the other side, Ram Gopal Varma who heard the script of Gulabi from Vamsi, decided to produce the film under 75 lakhs "As long as I control the budget under 75 lakhs, he would not be interfering. Suresh Babu, who also expressed interest to do the film with Vamsi had two options. One was to go for the Varma's film, that would give me creative freedom and no interference and other one was to go for Suresh's film where I need to prove myself. Obviously, I preferred the choice number one". Chakravarthy and Maheswari were selected as actor and actress respectively. Jeeva made his acting comeback with this film.  Chandra Mohan was the only senior established actor acted in this film. Vamsi said he "picked the raw people up so that they suit our budget". Vamsi recorded the first song ("E Rojaithe Choosano Ninnu") in Ramanaidu recording theatres, as that song a uses minimal number of instruments, mixing and background score was also held in that studio. Gulabi was the first movie to be recorded in Ramanaidu Recording Theaters.

Soundtrack

The music was composed by Shashi Preetam. The soundtrack contains five songs and was very popular upon its release with "Ee Velalo Neevu" becoming a classic hit.

Awards
 Nandi Award for Best Audiographer - P. Madhusudhana Rao

References

External links
 

1995 films
1990s Telugu-language films
Films directed by Krishna Vamsi
Films about prostitution in India
Indian romantic thriller films
Films about human trafficking in India
Telugu films remade in other languages
1995 directorial debut films
1990s romantic thriller films